Clair Maxwell (1890–1957) was a 20th-century American magazine publisher.

Early years
Maxwell was born in 1890 in South Dakota.  He was one of eight children, including brothers: Lee Maxwell; President of Crowell Publishing Company, Ray G. Maxwell; advertising agent, and Lloyd Maxwell; of Williams & Cunnyngham agency in Chicago.

Before Life
Maxwell served in World War I as a transport pilot. In 1918 he married Dorothy Boyden, daughter of a Chicago jeweler and a graduate of the University of Chicago.  He and Dorothy had three children, Clair Maxwell Jr., Joan Maxwell Alvarez (television producer), and Hope Tate.

Life magazine
He was the publisher of Life magazine (when it was a general interest magazine) from 1921 to 1942.  He acquired the magazine on the verge of financial ruin, and brought it back to being profitable after years of modifying its format and editorial style.  After selling the business to Henry Luce in 1942 he worked for Luce for a short time before retiring to St. Augustine, Florida.

After Life
Maxwell became a partner in a liquor distribution company serving northern and central Florida.  He died in September 1957 from a smoking-related disease now known as congestive obstructive pulmonary disorder.

Golf
Maxwell was an enthusiastic golfer.  The "four Brothers Maxwell" (Clair/Lee/Ray/Lloyd) had a standing challenge to any other foursome of one family, or any foursome of the publishing business.

In 1931 when the USGA had approved a new tour ball, Maxwell had a strong personal opinion of the new ball, which he widely publicized. He called it a "cross between a ping-pong globule and a Mexican jumping bean".

References

American male journalists
20th-century American journalists
1890 births
1957 deaths
American magazine publishers (people)